Jürgen Melzer was the defending champion, but did not complete in the Juniors this year.

Nicolas Mahut defeated Mario Ančić in the final, 3–6, 6–3, 7–5 to win the boys' singles tennis title at the 2000 Wimbledon Championships.

Seeds

  Nicolas Mahut (champion)
  Todor Enev (semifinals)
  Joachim Johansson (second round)
  Mario Ančić (final)
  Andrej Kračman (quarterfinals)
  Adrian Cruciat (first round)
  Maximilian Abel (first round)
  Andriy Dernovskiy (second round)
  Roman Valent (third round)
  Lu Yen-hsun (first round)
  Alejandro Falla (second round)
  Michal Kokta (third round)
  Janko Tipsarević (first round)
  Bruno Soares (first round)
  Cristian Villagrán (third round)
  Kristof Vliegen (quarterfinals)

Draw

Finals

Top half

Section 1

Section 2

Bottom half

Section 3

Section 4

References

External links

Boys' Singles
Wimbledon Championship by year – Boys' singles